Bartholomew O'Keeffe (born 2 April 1945) is a former Irish Fianna Fáil politician who served as Minister for Enterprise, Trade and Innovation from 2010 to 2011, Minister for Education and Science from 2008 to 2010 and a Minister of State from 2004 to 2008. He served as a Teachta Dála (TD) from 1987 to 1989 and from 1992 to 2011. He was a Senator for the Labour Panel from 1989 to 1992.

Early life and education
O'Keeffe was born in Cullen, County Cork. He was educated at St. Brendan's College, Killarney and at University College Cork, where he received a Bachelor of Arts. O'Keeffe worked as a lecturer in the Cork Institute of Technology before becoming involved in politics. He also had a sporting career, being the holder of three Munster football Gaelic Athletic Association medals with Cork GAA at Under 21, Junior and Senior level. He was also a Cork Intermediate Handball Champion. In 1985, he was elected to Cork County Council. He was formerly chairman of the Southern Health Board. He is married to Mary Murphy; they have three daughters and one son.

Political career
O'Keeffe was first elected to the Dáil at the 1987 general election as a Fianna Fáil TD for the Cork South-Central constituency. He lost his seat to Micheál Martin at the 1989 general election, but he was subsequently elected to Seanad Éireann on the Labour Panel where he was Fianna Fáil Spokesperson for Finance. At the 1992 general election, O'Keeffe was re-elected to the Dáil and was re-elected at each subsequent election until his retirement in 2011. Between 1995 and 1997, O'Keeffe was Opposition Spokesperson on Transport and Communications. He has also served on a number of committees including the Joint Oireachtas Committee on Health and Children, the Public Accounts Committee and the Sustainable Development Committee. In a 2004 reshuffle, Bertie Ahern appointed O'Keeffe as Minister of State at the Department of the Environment, Heritage and Local Government with special responsibility for Environmental Protection.

In 2006, O'Keeffe was selected unopposed to contest the 2007 general election in the re-drawn Cork North-West constituency, along with Michael Moynihan and Donal Moynihan. O'Keeffe was elected, although his party colleague Donal Moynihan lost his seat. In 2007, O'Keeffe was appointed as Minister of State at the Department of the Environment, Heritage and Local Government with special responsibility for Housing and Urban Renewal. When Brian Cowen became Taoiseach in 2008, O'Keeffe was appointed as Minister for Education and Science. In this role, in 2010 he initiated a process of dissolving the National University of Ireland, a move that was later reversed in 2011 by the Fine Gael/Labour coalition.

Budget 2009

On 14 October 2008, as part of Budget 2009, O'Keeffe announced cutbacks and the imposition of increased charges to pay for the running of the Department of Education and Science throughout 2009, including the increase of the primary school teacher:pupil ratio 1:27 to 1:28 and the increase of the post-primary school teacher:pupil ratio from 1:18 to 1:19, although the capital allocation of €889m was increased by €80m.

On 29 October 2008, approximately 12,000 teachers and parents demonstrated against the education cuts announced in Budget 2009. The rally outside Leinster House coincided with a Dáil debate on a Labour Party motion calling for the increase in class sizes to be reversed. INTO General Secretary John Carr described the budget as an act of educational sabotage. Ferdia Kelly, representing most second-level school managers, said school principals and deputy principals "are saying loudly and clearly that they are not available to supervise classes where teachers are absent. Failure to act now on this proposal will lead to an unwelcome disruption of school life in January." The cutbacks removed substitution cover for uncertified sick leave, and for teachers on school business at second level, from 7 January 2009.

The education cutbacks were supported in the Dáil on 30 October 2008 by Fianna Fáil and the Green Party.
O'Keeffe accused the opposition parties of whipping up "hysteria" and said they were being dishonest with the Irish people.

The minority Protestant population in the Republic was outraged by cuts announced by the Minister for Education to grants previously available to the 21 Protestant denomination secondary schools. This breached a forty-year-old agreement that had been made when free secondary education was introduced by the then Minister for Education Donogh O'Malley. It was claimed that the cuts would disproportionately affect Protestant schools. Protestant parents claimed that they would have to accept fewer teachers per child, and that their schools would not be funded to employ non-academic staff in the way that their Roman Catholic neighbours are.

Proposed re-introduction of third-level fees
On 11 August 2008, O'Keeffe proposed the re-introduction of third-level fees which had been abolished in Ireland since 1995. While originally indicating that high earners would be hit, it was later announced that this scheme would raise far short of the €500 million in the original report compiled by UCC economist, Dr. Noel Woods. O'Keeffe stated that he wanted to increase third-level participation, and claimed that the "free fees" scheme had not accomplished this. After putting forward a range of options to the cabinet in July 2009, O'Keeffe set a deadline of 15 September 2009 for his colleagues to decide on the issue. The range of options was then discussed in a new programme for government. It was later announced in the new programme for government, brokered by both Fianna Fáil and the Green Party, that third-level fees would not be introduced in the lifetime of the government, although O'Keeffe had stated his support for their introduction and had stated that existing registration fees, commonly described as "fees by another name", faced an increase. His stance on fees was supported by former education ministers Noel Dempsey and Mary Hanafin.

Resignation and retirement
O'Keeffe resigned his position as Minister for Enterprise, Trade and Innovation on 20 January 2011. He retired from politics at the 2011 general election.

References

1945 births
Living people
Alumni of University College Cork
Cork inter-county Gaelic footballers
Fianna Fáil TDs
Local councillors in County Cork
Members of the 25th Dáil
Members of the 27th Dáil
Members of the 28th Dáil
Members of the 29th Dáil
Members of the 30th Dáil
Members of the 19th Seanad
Ministers for Education (Ireland)
Ministers of State of the 29th Dáil
Ministers of State of the 30th Dáil
People educated at St Brendan's College, Killarney
Politicians from County Cork
Fianna Fáil senators
Ministers for Enterprise, Trade and Employment